Thomas Leslie Wood (20 December 1932 – 24 January 2005) was an English footballer. A goalkeeper, he played 33 league games in the Football League, mostly for Barrow. He was also signed to Bolton Wanderers, Huddersfield Town, Port Vale, and Southport.

Career
Wood played for Woolfold St. James and Bolton Wanderers, before joining Huddersfield Town in 1952. The "Terriers" won promotion to the First Division in 1952–53, and made a bid for the Football League title in 1953–54, before falling away in 1954–55. However manager Andy Beattie was satisfied with the services of regular goalkeepers Harry Mills and Jack Wheeler, and Wood never made his first team debut at Leeds Road.

Wood spent the 1955–56 season with Barrow, and played 31 Third Division North games for Joe Harvey's struggling "Bluebirds". He left Holker Street, and joined Freddie Steele's Second Division side Port Vale for 'a reasonable fee' in June 1956. Working as Ray King's understudy, Wood conceded three goals on his debut against Blackburn Rovers at Vale Park on 12 January 1957. He played just one more game in 1956–57, and was transferred to Southport in January 1958 by new boss Norman Low. He played one Third Division North game for a struggling "Sandgrounders" side in 1957–58. After leaving Haig Avenue, he later turned out for non-league sides Rossendale United and Bolton Road.

Career statistics
Source:

References

1932 births
2005 deaths
People from Haslingden
English footballers
Association football goalkeepers
Bolton Wanderers F.C. players
Huddersfield Town A.F.C. players
Barrow A.F.C. players
Port Vale F.C. players
Southport F.C. players
Rossendale United F.C. players
English Football League players